The Massart Farmstead was located in Rosiere, Wisconsin.

History
The farmstead originally belonged to John Baptist and Theresa Massart. Over time, it was owned by a number of other families.

In 1980, the farmstead was added to the National Register of Historic Places. However, the farmhouse would be moved from its original site in Rosiere to the Heritage Hill State Park in Allouez, Wisconsin in 1984. The farmstead was removed from the register that year.

References

Farms on the National Register of Historic Places in Wisconsin
National Register of Historic Places in Kewaunee County, Wisconsin
Geography of Kewaunee County, Wisconsin

Former National Register of Historic Places in Wisconsin